The Atlantic Coast Conference honors players and coaches upon the conclusion of each college football season with the following individual honors as voted on by the Atlantic Coast Sports Media Association.

Coach of the Year

1953: Jim Tatum, Maryland
1954: William D. Murray, Duke
1955: Jim Tatum, Maryland
1956: Paul Amen, Wake Forest
1957: Earle Edwards, NC State
1958: Frank Howard, Clemson
1959: Paul Amen, Wake Forest
1960: William D. Murray, Duke
1961: Bill Elias, Virginia
1962: William D. Murray, Duke
1963: Jim Hickey, North Carolina; Earle Edwards, NC State
1964: Bill Tate, Wake Forest
1965: Earle Edwards, NC State
1966: Frank Howard, Clemson
1967: Earle Edwards, NC State
1968: George Blackburn, Virginia
1969: Paul Dietzel, South Carolina
1970: Cal Stoll, Wake Forest
1971: Bill Dooley, North Carolina
1972: Lou Holtz, NC State
1973: Jerry Claiborne, Maryland
1974: Red Parker, Clemson
1975: Jerry Claiborne, Maryland
1976: Jerry Claiborne, Maryland
1977: Charley Pell, Clemson
1978: Charley Pell, Clemson
1979: John Mackovic, Wake Forest
1980: Dick Crum, North Carolina
1981: Danny Ford, Clemson
1982: Bobby Ross, Maryland
1983: George Welsh, Virginia
1984: George Welsh, Virginia
1985: Bill Curry, Georgia Tech
1986: Dick Sheridan, NC State
1987: Bill Dooley, Wake Forest
1988: Steve Spurrier, Duke
1989: Steve Spurrier, Duke
1990: Bobby Ross, Georgia Tech
1991: George Welsh, Virginia
1992: Bill Dooley, Wake Forest
1993: Bobby Bowden, Florida State
1994: Fred Goldsmith, Duke
1995: George Welsh, Virginia
1996: Mack Brown, North Carolina
1997: Bobby Bowden, Florida State
1998: George O'Leary, Georgia Tech
1999: Tommy Bowden, Clemson
2000: George O'Leary, Georgia Tech
2001: Ralph Friedgen, Maryland
2002: Al Groh, Virginia
2003: Tommy Bowden, Clemson
2004: Frank Beamer, Virginia Tech
2005: Frank Beamer, Virginia Tech
2006: Jim Grobe, Wake Forest
2007: Al Groh, Virginia
2008: Paul Johnson, Georgia Tech
2009: Paul Johnson, Georgia Tech
2010: Ralph Friedgen, Maryland
2011: Mike London, Virginia
2012: David Cutcliffe, Duke
2013: David Cutcliffe, Duke
2014: Paul Johnson, Georgia Tech
2015: Dabo Swinney, Clemson
2016: Justin Fuente, Virginia Tech
2017: Mark Richt, Miami
2018: Dabo Swinney, Clemson
2019: Scott Satterfield, Louisville
2020: Brian Kelly, Notre Dame
2021: Dave Clawson, Wake Forest
2022: Mike Elko, Duke

Player of the Year

1953: Bernie Faloney, B, Maryland
1954: Jerry Barger, B, Duke
1955: Bob Pellegrini, C, Maryland
1956: Bill Barnes, B, Wake Forest
1957: Dick Christy, B, NC State
1958: Alex Hawkins, E, South Carolina
1959: Mike McGee, G, Duke
1960: Roman Gabriel, QB, NC State
1961: Roman Gabriel, QB, NC State
1962: Billy Gambrell, B, South Carolina
1963: Jay Wilkinson, B, Duke
1964: Brian Piccolo, B, Wake Forest
1965: Danny Talbott, B, North Carolina
1966: Bob Davis, B, Virginia
1967: Buddy Gore, B, Clemson
1968: Frank Quayle, B, Virginia
1969: Don McCauley, B, North Carolina
1970: Don McCauley, B, North Carolina
1971: Ernie Jackson, DB, Duke
1972: Steve Jones, RB, Duke
1973: Willie Burden, RB, NC State
1974: Randy White, DT, Maryland
1975: Mike Voight, RB, North Carolina
1976: Mike Voight, RB, North Carolina
1977: Steve Fuller, QB, Clemson
1978: Steve Fuller, QB, Clemson
1979: Jay Venuto, QB, Wake Forest
1980: Lawrence Taylor, LB, North Carolina
1981: Jeff Davis, LB, Clemson
1982: Chris Castor, WR, Duke
1983: Ben Bennett, QB, Duke
1984: William Perry, DL, Clemson
1985: Barry Word, RB, Virginia
1986: Erik Kramer, QB, NC State
1987: Michael Perry, DT, Clemson
1988: Anthony Dilweg, QB, Duke
1989: Clarkston Hines, WR, Duke
1990: Shawn Moore, QB, Virginia
1991: Matt Blundin, QB, Virginia
1992: Charlie Ward, QB, Florida State
1993: Charlie Ward, QB, Florida State
1994: Robert Baldwin, RB, Duke
1995: Danny Kanell, QB, Florida State
1996: Tiki Barber, RB, Virginia
1997: Andre Wadsworth, DE, Florida State
1998: Torry Holt, WR, NC State
1999: Joe Hamilton, QB, Georgia Tech
2000: Chris Weinke, QB, Florida State
2001: E. J. Henderson, LB, Maryland
2002: Matt Schaub, QB, Virginia
2003: Philip Rivers, QB, NC State
2004: Bryan Randall, QB, Virginia Tech
2005: Chris Barclay, RB, Wake Forest
2006: Calvin Johnson, WR, Georgia Tech
2007: Matt Ryan, QB, Boston College
2008: Jonathan Dwyer, RB, Georgia Tech
2009: C. J. Spiller, RB/KR, Clemson
2010: Tyrod Taylor, QB, Virginia Tech
2011: David Wilson, RB, Virginia Tech
2012: Tajh Boyd, QB, Clemson
2013: Jameis Winston, QB, Florida State
2014: James Conner, RB, Pittsburgh
2015: Deshaun Watson, QB, Clemson
2016: Lamar Jackson, QB, Louisville
2017: Lamar Jackson, QB, Louisville
2018: Travis Etienne, RB, Clemson 
2019: Travis Etienne, RB, Clemson
2020: Trevor Lawrence, QB, Clemson
2021: Kenny Pickett, QB, Pittsburgh
2022: Drake Maye, QB, North Carolina

Rookie of the Year

1975: Ted Brown, RB, NC State
1976: James McDougald, RB, Wake Forest
1977: Amos Lawrence, RB, North Carolina
1978: Darrell Nicholson, LB, North Carolina
1979: Chuck McSwain, RB, Clemson
1980: Ben Bennett, QB, Duke
1981: Joe McIntosh, RB, NC State
1982: Michael Ramseur, RB, Wake Forest
1983: Cory Collier, RB, Georgia Tech
1984: John Ford, WR, Virginia
1985: Jerry Mays, RB, Georgia Tech
1986: Ray Agnew, DT, NC State
1987: Terry Allen, RB, Clemson
1988: Jessee Campbell, DB, NC State
1989: Shawn Jones, QB, Georgia Tech
1990: Ronald Williams, RB, Clemson
1991: Jimy Lincoln, RB, Georgia Tech
1992: Tamarick Vanover, WR, Florida State
1993: Leon Johnson, RB, North Carolina
1994: Ronde Barber, DB, Virginia
1995: Anthony Simmons, LB, Clemson
1996: Dré Bly, DB, North Carolina
1997: Travis Minor, RB, Florida State
1998: Ray Robinson, RB, NC State
1999: Koren Robinson, WR, NC State
2000: Philip Rivers, QB, NC State
2001: Chris Rix, QB, Florida State
2002: T. A. McLendon, RB, NC State
2003: Reggie Ball, QB, Georgia Tech
2004: Calvin Johnson, WR, Georgia Tech
2005: James Davis, RB, Clemson
2006: Riley Skinner, QB, Wake Forest
2007: Josh Adams, RB, Wake Forest
2008: Russell Wilson, QB, NC State
2009: Ryan Williams, RB, Virginia Tech
2010: Danny O'Brien, QB, Maryland
2011: Sammy Watkins, WR, Clemson
2012: Duke Johnson, RB, Miami
2013: Jameis Winston, QB, Florida State
2014: Brad Kaaya, QB, Miami
2015: Jordan Whitehead, DB, Pittsburgh
2016: Deondre Francois, QB, Florida State
2017: A. J. Dillon, RB, Boston College
2018: Trevor Lawrence, QB, Clemson 
2019: Sam Howell, QB, North Carolina
2020: Kyren Williams, RB, Notre Dame
2021: Tyler Van Dyke, QB, Miami
2022: Drake Maye, QB, North Carolina

Offensive Player of the Year

1993: Charlie Ward, QB, Florida State
1994: Robert Baldwin, RB, Duke
1995: Danny Kanell, QB, Florida State
1996: Tiki Barber, RB, Virginia
1997: Thad Busby, QB, Florida State
1998: Torry Holt, WR, NC State
1999: Joe Hamilton, QB, Georgia Tech
2000: Chris Weinke, QB, Florida State
2001: Bruce Perry, RB, Maryland
2002: Matt Schaub, QB, Virginia
2003: Philip Rivers, QB, NC State
2004: Bryan Randall, QB, Virginia Tech
2005: Chris Barclay, RB, Wake Forest
2006: Calvin Johnson, WR, Georgia Tech
2007: Matt Ryan, QB, Boston College
2008: Jonathan Dwyer, RB, Georgia Tech
2009: C. J. Spiller, RB/KR, Clemson
2010: Tyrod Taylor, QB, Virginia Tech
2011: David Wilson, RB, Virginia Tech
2012: Tajh Boyd, QB, Clemson
2013: Jameis Winston, QB, Florida State
2014: James Conner, RB, Pittsburgh
2015: Deshaun Watson, QB, Clemson
2016: Lamar Jackson, QB, Louisville
2017: Lamar Jackson, QB, Louisville
2018: Travis Etienne, RB, Clemson 
2019: Travis Etienne, RB, Clemson
2020: Trevor Lawrence, QB, Clemson
2021: Kenny Pickett, QB, Pittsburgh
2022: Drake Maye, QB, North Carolina

Defensive Player of the Year

1993: Derrick Brooks, LB, Florida State
1994: Derrick Alexander, DE, Florida State
1995: Marcus Jones, DE, North Carolina
1996: Peter Boulware, LB, Florida State
1997: Andre Wadsworth, DE, Florida State
1998: Anthony Poindexter, DB, Virginia
1999: Keith Adams, LB, Clemson
2000: Levar Fisher, LB, NC State
2001: E. J. Henderson, LB, Maryland
2002: E. J. Henderson, LB, Maryland
2003: Darnell Dockett, DL, Florida State
2004: Leroy Hill, LB, Clemson
2005: D'Qwell Jackson, LB, Maryland
2006: Gaines Adams, DE, Clemson
2007: Chris Long, DE, Virginia
2008: Mark Herzlich, LB, Boston College
2009: Derrick Morgan, DE, Georgia Tech
2010: Da'Quan Bowers, DE, Clemson
2011: Luke Kuechly, LB, Boston College
2012: Björn Werner, DE, Florida State
2013: Aaron Donald, DL, Pittsburgh
2014: Vic Beasley, DE, Clemson
2015: Jeremy Cash, DB, Duke
2016: Ben Boulware, LB, Clemson; DeMarcus Walker, DE, Florida State
2017: Bradley Chubb, DE, NC State
2018: Clelin Ferrell, DE, Clemson
2019: Isaiah Simmons, LB, Clemson
2020: Jeremiah Owusu-Koramoah, LB, Notre Dame
2021: Jermaine Johnson II, DE, Florida State
2022: Calijah Kancey, DL, Pittsburgh

Offensive Rookie of the Year

2007: Josh Adams, RB, Wake Forest
2008: Russell Wilson, QB, NC State
2009: Ryan Williams, RB, Virginia Tech
2010: Danny O'Brien, QB, Maryland
2011: Sammy Watkins, WR, Clemson
2012: Duke Johnson, RB, Miami
2013: Jameis Winston, QB, Florida State
2014: Brad Kaaya, QB, Miami
2015: Qadree Ollison, RB, Pittsburgh
2016: Deondre Francois, QB, Florida State
2017: A. J. Dillon, RB, Boston College
2018: Trevor Lawrence, QB, Clemson 
2019: Sam Howell, QB, North Carolina 
2020: Kyren Williams, RB, Notre Dame
2021: Tyler Van Dyke, QB, Miami
2022: Drake Maye, QB, North Carolina

Defensive Rookie of the Year

2006: Myron Rolle, DB, Florida State
2007: Deunta Williams, DB, North Carolina
2008: Sean Spence, LB, Miami
2009: Luke Kuechly, LB, Boston College
2010: Xavier Rhodes, CB, Florida State
2011: Merrill Noel, CB, Wake Forest
2012: Ronald Darby, CB, Florida State
2013: Kendall Fuller, CB, Virginia Tech
2014: Quin Blanding, S, Virginia
2015: Jordan Whitehead, DB, Pittsburgh
2016: Dexter Lawrence, DT, Clemson
2017: Brenton Nelson, S, Virginia
2018: Andre Cisco, S, Syracuse
2019: Gregory Rousseau, DE, Miami
2020: Bryan Bresee, DT, Clemson
2021: Andrew Mukuba, S, Clemson
2022: Patrick Payton, DE, Florida State

Brian Piccolo Award

1970: Paul Miller, QB, North Carolina
1971: Jim Webster, LB, North Carolina
1972: Mark Johnson, QB, Duke
1973: Al Neville, QB, Maryland
1974: David Visaggio, DG,  Maryland
1975: Scott Gardner, QB, Virginia
1976: Jeff Green, DE, Duke
1977: Ralph Stringer, DB, NC State
1978: Rex Varn, DB, Clemson
1979: Al Richardson, LB, Georgia Tech
1980: Jack Cain, DB, Clemson
1981: Aaron Stewart, DB, Duke
1982: Kenny Duckett, WR, Wake Forest
1983: John Piedmonte, OLB, Wake Forest
1984: J. D. Maarleveld, T,  Maryland
1985: Danny Burmeister, DB, N. Carolina
1986: Ray Williams, WR, Clemson
1987: No Recipient
1988: Jerry Mays, TB, Georgia Tech
1989: Michael Anderson, RB, Maryland
1990: Marc Mays, WR, Duke
1991: Scott Adell, T,  NC State
1992: Dan Footman, DE, Florida State; Randy Cuthbert, TB,  Duke
1993: Scott Youmans, DL, Duke
1994: Chris Harrison, T, Virginia
1995: Warren Forney, DT, Clemson
1996: John Lewis, RB, Wake Forest
1997: Sam Cowart, LB, Florida State
1998: Anthony Poindexter, DB, Virginia; Corey Simon, DT, Florida State
1999: Chris Weinke, QB,  Florida State
2000: Ed Wilder, FB, Georgia Tech
2001: Matt Crawford, T, Maryland
2002: Anquan Boldin, WR, Florida State
2003: Kevin Bailey, OL, Virginia
2004: Frank Gore, RB, Miami
2005: Ryan Best, S, Virginia
2006: Glenn Sharpe, Miami
2007: Matt Robinson, DE, Wake Forest
2008: Robert Quinn, DE, North Carolina
2009: Toney Baker, RB, NC State
2010: Mark Herzlich, LB, Boston College; Nate Irving, LB, NC State
2011: Giovani Bernard, RB, North Carolina
2012: Shayon Green, DE, Miami; Chris Thompson, RB, Florida State
2013: Robert Godhigh, RB, Georgia Tech
2014: Duke Johnson, RB, Miami
2015: Hunter Knighton, OL, Miami
2016: James Conner, RB, Pittsburgh
2017: Trevon Young, DE/OLB, Louisville
2018: Greg Dortch, WR, Wake Forest
2019: Richard Yeargin, DE, Boston College
2020: Nolan Cooney, P, Syracuse
2021: Justyn Ross, WR, Clemson; McKenzie Milton, QB, Florida State
2022: Sam Hartman, QB, Wake Forest

50th anniversary team

Bill Armstrong, Wake Forest (1973–1976) 
Tiki Barber, Virginia (1993–1996) 
Dré Bly, North Carolina (1996–1998) 
Joe Bostic, Clemson (1975–1978) 
Peter Boulware, Florida State (1994–1996) 
Derrick Brooks, Florida State (1991–1994) 
Ted Brown, NC State (1975–1978) 
Kelvin Bryant, North Carolina (1979–1982) 
Jerry Butler, Clemson (1975–1978) 
Dennis Byrd, NC State (1965–1967) 
Dick Christy, NC State (1955–1957) 
Marco Coleman, Georgia Tech (1989–1991) 
Bennie Cunningham, Clemson (1973–1975) 
Jeff Davis, Clemson (1978–1981) 
Jim Dombrowski, Virginia (1982–1985) 
Warrick Dunn, Florida State (1993–1996) 
Boomer Esiason, Maryland (1981–1983) 
Steve Fuller, Clemson (1975–1978) 
William Fuller, North Carolina (1980–1983) 
Roman Gabriel, NC State (1960–1961) 
Joe Hamilton, Georgia Tech (1996–1999) 
Alex Hawkins, South Carolina (1956–1958) 
Clarkston Hines, Duke (1986–1989) 
Torry Holt, NC State (1995–1998) 
Sebastian Janikowski, Florida State (1997–1999)
Marvin Jones, Florida State (1990–1992) 
Stan Jones, Maryland (1951–1953) 
Terry Kinard, Clemson (1978–1982) 
Amos Lawrence, North Carolina (1977–1980) 
Bob Matheson, Duke (1964–1966) 
Don McCauley, North Carolina (1968–1970) 
Mike McGee, Duke (1957–1959) 
Herman Moore, Virginia (1988–1990) 
Bob Pellegrini, Maryland (1953–1955) 
Julius Peppers, North Carolina (1999–2001) 
Michael Dean Perry, Clemson (1984–1987) 
William Perry, Clemson (1981–1984) 
Brian Piccolo, Wake Forest (1962–1964) 
Frank Quayle, Virginia (1966–1968) 
Jim Ritcher, NC State (1976–1979) 
Anthony Simmons, Clemson (1995–1997) 
Chris Slade, Virginia (1988–1992) 
Norm Snead, Wake Forest (1958–1960) 
Ken Swilling, Georgia Tech (1988–1991) 
Lawrence Taylor, North Carolina (1978–1980) 
Mike Voight, North Carolina (1973–1976) 
Charlie Ward, Florida State (1990–1993) 
Peter Warrick, Florida State (1996–1999) 
Chris Weinke, Florida State (1997–2000) 
Randy White, Maryland (1972–1974)

References

College football conference awards and honors
Honors